is a junction passenger railway station located in the town of Shimanto, Takaoka District, Kōchi Prefecture, Japan. It is the main station for the town of Shimanto and hosts the railway services of both the Shikoku Railway Company (JR Shikoku) (as station K26) and the third-sector Tosa Kuroshio Railway (as station TK26).

Lines

Kubokawa does not bear a station number with the "G" prefix which is used for stations on the Yodo Line.

The station is also the start of the 43.4 kilometer Tosa Kuroshio Railway Nakamura Line with the station number TK26.

In addition to these local lines, Kubokawa is also a stop for the following JR Shikoku limited express services:

Layout
The station consists of two side platforms and one island platform serving four tracks. Platform 1 serves a siding which is used exclusively by the Nakamura Line and is accessed from the Tosa Kuroshio Railway station building. Platforms 2 and 3 (which share an island) and platform 4 (a side platform) are used by JR Shikoku trains. These are accessed by a footbridge from the JR Shikoku station building or a level crossing. Several sidings branch off tracks 3 and 4. The JR station building houses a waiting room and a JR ticket window (Midori no Madoguchi). Car parking and a bike shed are available outside.

Adjacent stations

|-
!colspan=5|JR Shikoku

|-
!colspan=5|Tosa Kuroshio Railway

History
The station opened on 12 November 1951 under the control of Japanese National Railways as the terminus of the Dosan Line. The JNR Nakamura Line connected to this station on 18 December 1963 and the JNR Yodo Line on 1 March 1974. After the privatization of JNR on 1 April 1987, control of the station passed to JR Shikoku. The JNR Nakamura Line was privatized to the Tosa Kuroshio Railway on 1 April 1988.

Surrounding area
Iwamoto-ji
Shimanto River
Shimanto Town Hall

See also
 List of railway stations in Japan

References

External links
Kubokawa Station (JR Shikoku)

Railway stations in Kōchi Prefecture
Yodo Line
Railway stations in Japan opened in 1951
Shimanto, Kōchi (town)